Palmer High School may refer to several schools:

Palmer High School (Alaska), Palmer, Alaska 
Palmer High School (Colorado), Colorado Springs, Colorado
Palmer High School (Massachusetts), Palmer, Massachusetts 
Palmer High School (Texas), Palmer, Texas

See also
Robert Cecil Palmer Secondary School, Richmond, British Columbia, Canada
Lewis-Palmer High School, Monument, Colorado